Truman Day is a commemorative holiday to celebrate the birth of Harry S. Truman, the 33rd President of the United States. It is celebrated May 8 in Missouri as a state holiday, according to Missouri Revised Statutes Section 9-035 Public Holidays and nationally by the United States Democratic Party. Since Truman was the only president to come from Missouri, this day is special for this state.  However, after the financial crisis of 2008–2010, there were unsuccessful moves by the state government to abolish the holiday. For Missouri state employees, this is a paid holiday.

Origins

 
Harry S. Truman (May 8, 1884December 26, 1972) was the 33rd President of the United States (1945–1953), an American politician of the Democratic Party. He served as a United States senator from Missouri (1935–1945) and briefly as Vice President (1945) before he succeeded to the presidency on April 12, 1945, upon the death of Franklin D. Roosevelt. He was president during the final months of World War II, making the decision to drop the atomic bomb on Hiroshima and Nagasaki. Truman was elected in his own right in 1948. He presided over an uncertain domestic scene as America sought its path after the war, and  tensions with the Soviet Union increased, marking the start of the Cold War.

See also

 Public holidays in Missouri

References

External links
 State employees still get Truman Day off — this year at least ...
 Section 9-035 May 8, Truman Day.
 Holidays: Truman Day in the United States

State holidays in the United States
May observances
Harry S. Truman
Presidential birthdays in the United States
Missouri culture